Frederick John Austin Barker (31 October 1903 – 6 May 1974) was an Australian rules footballer who played with Collingwood and Hawthorn in the Victorian Football League (VFL).

Notes

External links 
		
Fred Barker's profile at Collingwood Forever

1903 births
1974 deaths
Collingwood Football Club players
Hawthorn Football Club players
Australian rules footballers from Melbourne
People from Clifton Hill, Victoria